The 2010 season was Kelantan FA's 2nd consecutive season in the Malaysia Super League. This article shows statistics of the club's players in the season, and also lists all matches that the club played in the season. Kelantan's Super League season began with a 0–0 drawn to Terengganu FA.

Competitions

Super League

Results summary

League table

FA Cup

 Aggregate 1–1. Kelantan lost on away-goal rules.

Malaysia Cup

Kelantan won on aggregate 3–0.

Kelantan won on aggregate 1–0.

Group A

Team officials

Player statistics

Squad
Last updated 23 May 2013

Key:
 = Appearances,
 = Goals,
 = Yellow card,
 = Red card

Goalscorers 

Source: Competitions

Transfers

All start dates are pending confirmation.

In

Out

See also
 List of Kelantan FA seasons

References

See also
 List of Kelantan FA seasons

Kelantan FA
2010
Kelantan